The Central District of Kiar County is in Chaharmahal and Bakhtiari province, Iran. At the 2006 census, its population was 36,988 in 9,074 households, when its constituent parts were in Shahrekord County. The following census in 2011 counted 42,540 people in 12,343 households, by which time Kiar County had become established. At the latest census in 2016, the district had 35,015 inhabitants living in 10,853 households.

References 

Kiar County

Districts of Chaharmahal and Bakhtiari Province

Populated places in Chaharmahal and Bakhtiari Province

Populated places in Kiar County